Pterostylis puberula, commonly known as the dwarf greenhood or snail greenhood is a species of orchid which is endemic to New Zealand. It has a rosette of pale yellowish, stalked leaves and a single silvery-white and green flower with relatively long, erect lateral sepals.

Description
Pterostylis puberula is a terrestrial,  perennial, deciduous, herb with an underground tuber and a rosette of a large number of leaves. Flowering plants have a similar rosette at the base of the flowering stem, a single silvery-white flower with pale green stripes and one or two small leaves with their bases wrapped around the flowering stem. The dorsal sepal and petals are fused, forming a hood or "galea" over the column. The lateral sepals are fused near their bases, almost closing the front of the flower and have erect, thread-like tips much taller than the galea. The labellum is not visible outside the intact flower. Flowering occurs in September and October.

Taxonomy and naming
Pterostylis puberula was first formally described by Joseph Dalton Hooker and the description was published in Flora Novae-Zelandiae. The specific epithet (puberula) is a Latin word meaning "downy".

Distribution and habitat
The dwarf greenhood grows in scrubland in disjunct populations on the North and South Islands and on the Three Kings Islands. It has recently only been sighted on Great Barrier Island, Surville Cliffs  and near Thames.

Conservation status
Pterostylis puberula is classed as "threatened – nationally vulnerable" under the New Zealand Threat Classification System.

References

puberula
Orchids of New Zealand
Plants described in 1853